The 1979 World 600, the 20th running of the event, was a NASCAR Winston Cup Series race that was held on May 27, 1979, at Charlotte Motor Speedway in Concord, North Carolina.

Before the performance, a skydiver was brought in to bring thrills to the audience; he would parachute into one of the turns. There was also an invocation service followed by the national anthem.

Race report
Darrell Waltrip and Dale Earnhardt would fight it out on the closing laps of this race; Richard Petty would make a comeback and lose to Darrell Waltrip by six seconds.

Dick Brooks had terminal damage to his vehicle on lap 10. Blackie Wangerin would spin his vehicle out on lap 29 but would ultimately finish the race. Bill Elliott blew his engine on lap 36. Connie Saylor ended up crashing his vehicle on lap 114 while Bobby Fisher's race would end on lap 136. Glenn Jarrett spun his vehicle out on lap 167. Bobby Allison's had engine problems on lap 186 but he would finish the race.

While Earnhardt led 122 laps, Waltrip would mount an incredible racing strategy; leading at the most opportune times in the race. While Bobby Allison had engine problems, Tighe Scott had a tie rod issue on lap 372. Ron Hutcherson and Chuck Bown would fail to start the race due to various issues with their vehicle. There were 41 drivers on the starting grid. The duration of this race was 263 minutes with an audience of 136,000 in attendance for what would become a race loaded with lead changes. Chevrolet vehicles dominated the starting grid.

Winnings for this event ranged from the winner's portion of $55,400 ($ when adjusted for inflation) to the last-place of $1,165 ($ when adjusted for inflation). from a grand total of $321,780 ($ when adjusted for inflation).

On May 16, 18-year-old Kyle Petty crashed twice during private tests. Two Dodges were badly damaged and his father Richard withdrew him from the race because he was not ready.

Qualifying

Withdrew from race: Kyle Petty

Finishing order
Section reference:

 Darrell Waltrip
 Richard Petty
 Dale Earnhardt
 Cale Yarborough
 Benny Parsons
 Ricky Rudd
 Terry Labonte
 Al Holbert
 Lennie Pond
 Richard Childress
 Grant Adcox
 Buddy Arrington
 J.D. McDuffie
 Ronnie Thomas
 Blackie Wangerin
 Tighe Scott
 Cecil Gordon
 D.K. Ulrich
 Jim Vandiver
 Tommy Gale
 Frank Warren
 Bobby Allison
 Harry Gant
 Bruce Hill
 Neil Bonnett
 Dave Marcis
 Joe Millikan
 Bill Dennis
 Glenn Jarrett
 Coo Coo Marlin
 Bobby Fisher
 Skip Manning
 James Hylton
 Connie Saylor
 Travis Tiller
 Buddy Baker
 Donnie Allison
 Bill Elliott
 Dick Brooks
 Chuck Bown
 Ron Hutcherson

Standings after the race

References

World 600
World 600
NASCAR races at Charlotte Motor Speedway